Nyayam Ketkirom is a 1973 Indian Tamil language film, directed by C. V. Rajendran and produced by A. L. Srinivasan. The film stars R. Muthuraman, A. V. M. Rajan, Vennira Aadai Nirmala, and Kanchana. It was released on 18 May 1973.

Plot

Cast 
R. Muthuraman
A. V. M. Rajan
Vennira Aadai Nirmala
Kanchana
Nagesh
Manorama
V. K. Ramasamy
Cho Ramaswamy
M. N. Nambiar

Production 
A film with the same title was earlier planned by Jayakanthan but did not come to fruition.

Soundtrack 
The music was composed by K. V. Mahadevan with lyrics by Kannadasan.

References

External links 
 

1970s Tamil-language films
1973 films
Films directed by C. V. Rajendran
Films scored by M. S. Viswanathan